Upper Magpie Lake is a lake in the Lake Superior drainage basin in Algoma District, Ontario, Canada and the source of the Magpie River. The primary outflow is the Magpie River which flows into Lake Superior.

See also
List of lakes in Ontario

References

Lakes of Algoma District